The 1982 Green Bay Packers season was their 64th season overall and their 62nd season in the National Football League, and was shortened due to a players' strike. The team posted a 5–3–1 record under coach Bart Starr. Due to the strike, the NFL ignored division standing and placed eight teams from each conference into the playoffs. The Packers finished the season in third place, which earned them a playoff berth. The Packers beat the Cardinals 41–16 in the first round, but lost to the Dallas Cowboys 37–26 in the second. Their playoff berth was the first for the Packers in ten seasons, their first playoff win in the post-Vince Lombardi era, and their only playoff win from 1968 to 1992. Additionally, the game against the Cardinals was their first home playoff game since the Super Bowl season of 1967.

The strike prevented both games of the Bears–Packers rivalry from being played this year, making the Lions–Packers rivalry the longest-running annual series in the league. It also led to Milwaukee becoming the Packers primary home by happenstance, as three of their four regular-season home games were played at Milwaukee County Stadium, although the playoff game against the Cardinals was at Lambeau.

Offseason

NFL draft

Undrafted free agents

Personnel

Staff

Roster

Regular season

Schedule 

Note: Intra-division opponents are in bold text.

Standings

Playoffs

NFC First Round 

In the Packers' first home playoff game in 15 years, quarterback Lynn Dickey threw for 260 yards and 4 touchdowns en route to a 41–16 win. The Packers scored four touchdowns on four consecutive possessions. It was their first playoff victory since Super Bowl II.

NFC Second Round 

The Cowboys scored touchdowns on two 80-yard drives while cornerback Dennis Thurman had 3 interceptions, including a 39-yard touchdown and one to clinch the victory. Packers quarterback Lynn Dickey threw for a franchise postseason record 332 yards and a touchdown, but his 3 interceptions were too costly to overcome. Receiver James Lofton caught 5 passes for 109 yards and a touchdown, and also had a 71-yard touchdown run on a reverse play, which tied the record for longest running play in a playoff game at the time.

Green Bay finished the game with a franchise playoff record 466 total yards.

Awards and records 
 Led NFL in points scored (226)

References 

Green Bay Packers seasons
Green Bay Packers
Green Bay